Ceratostema is a genus of shrubs or dwarf shrubs and lianas in the heather family (Ericaceae).

Species

References

External links
 
 

 
Ericaceae genera